Klaus Bechgaard (5 March 1945 – 7 March 2017) was a Danish scientist and chemist, noted for being one of the first scientists in the world to synthesize a number of organic charge transfer complexes and demonstrate their superconductivity, therefore the name Bechgaard salt. These salts all exhibit superconductivity at low temperatures.

The first unconventional superconductor composed of organic material, was discovered by Bechgaard and  Denis Jerome in 1979. This discovery garnered attention in the international scientific community, and for a period he was one of the most cited scientists in the field of natural sciences. He also received a nomination for the Nobel Prize in chemistry for this discovery.

Research
Klaus Bechgaard did research at the University of Copenhagen, where he also held a Professorship in organic chemistry until 1993. From 1993 until 2000 he was the chairman of the Department of Physics and Chemistry at Risø and in 2001 he was appointed head of the newly assigned Department of Polymer Research at Risø. From 2001 and onwards he was the head of Risø's nano technology programme, and The Danish Center of Polymers which is a joint venture between the Technical University of Copenhagen and Risø.

Bechgaard also conducted research in the field of polymers and nano technology at the University of Copenhagen.

Career and achievements

Education:

 1969: Cand scient. Organic Chemistry, University of Copenhagen
 1973: Lic.Scient. (Chemistry), University of Copenhagen.

Academic Appointments:

 1974–1984: Lecturer at the University of Copenhagen.
 1984–1989: Research Professor at the University of Copenhagen
 1989–1993: Professor of Organic Chemistry at the University of Copenhagen.
 1993–2000: Head of the Department of Condensed Matter Physics and Chemistry. Risø
 2001–2003: In charge of the Interdisciplinary Nanotechnology Programme, Risø
 2001–2003: Temporary Head of The Danish Polymer Centre and the Polymer Department Risø
 2004–2017: Professor of Chemistry at the University of Copenhagen (May 2004 – March 2017). Deputy Head of Department

Other:

 2004: A. J. Heeger Endowed Chair, UCSB, Santa Barbara

Honours:

 1983: Elected member of the Danish Academy of Natural Sciences
 1984: Elected member of the Royal Danish Academy.
 2002: Elected member of the French Academy of Sciences

Publications:

 Approximately 370 peer reviewed papers in Chemistry and Solid State Physics, 7 patents

Awards:

 1981: The HN-prize
 1986: The B.S. Friedmann-prize, University of California
 1987: The Director Ib Henriksen's Foundation Research award
 1990: The Macintosh Research award
 1991: EPS Europhysics Prize
 1991: The Hewlett Packard Europhysics prize
 1997: The NKT scientific prize
 2000: The EU Descartes prize
 2008: The Hartmann Foundation memorial prize

See also 
 Bechgaard salt
 Unconventional superconductor
 Organic superconductor
 Van Hove singularity
 Tetrathiafulvalene
 Tetracyanoethylene
 Solid-state chemistry

References 

 People, ideas, entrepreneurship & innovation.http://www.tmp.ucsb.edu/extracurricular/on_the_edge.html
 D. Jérome, A. Mazaud, M. Ribault, K. Bechgaard, Superconductivity in a synthetic organic conductor: (TMTSF)2PF6], J. Phys. Lett. (Paris) 41, L95 (1980).
 K. Bechgaard, K. Carneiro, M. Olsen, F. Rasmussen and C.S. Jacobsen, Zero-pressure organic superconductor: di-(tetramethyltetraselenafulvalenium)-perchlorate [(TMTSF)2ClO4], Phys. Rev. Lett. 46, 852 (1981).

1945 births
2017 deaths
Danish scientists
Members of the French Academy of Sciences
Solid state chemists
Academic staff of the University of Copenhagen